The 1972 French Grand Prix was a Formula One motor race held at the Circuit de Charade in Clermont-Ferrand, Auvergne, France on 2 July 1972. It was race 6 of 12 in both the 1972 World Championship of Drivers and the 1972 International Cup for Formula One Manufacturers.

The Circuit de Charade's natural setting around the base of an extinct volcano created safety concerns due to the dark, volcanic rocks which fell from the mountain onto both sides of the track. Drivers who skirted the track edge would often send rocks flying into the middle of the road and into the path of pursuing competitors. The hazard was highlighted when driver Helmut Marko suffered a career-ending injury during the race, when a stone thrown from Emerson Fittipaldi's Lotus penetrated his helmet visor and blinded him in the left eye. The rocks also meant that tyre punctures were a perennial hazard on the circuit, as was shown when ten competitors suffered punctures during the race. The French Grand Prix was moved to the new Circuit Paul Ricard for 1973.

Chris Amon achieved the fifth and final pole position of his career and was leading the race in his Matra until a puncture forced him to pit, leaving Jackie Stewart to win in his Tyrrell-Ford. Fittipaldi finished second, just ahead of a charging Amon, who shattered the circuit's lap record.

Qualifying

Qualifying classification

Race

Classification

Championship standings after the race

Drivers' Championship standings

Constructors' Championship standings

Note: Only the top five positions are included for both sets of standings.

References

French Grand Prix
French Grand Prix
1972 in French motorsport